The 1981–82 Tulsa Golden Hurricane men's basketball team represented the University of Tulsa as a member of the Missouri Valley Conference during the 1981–82 college basketball season. The Golden Hurricane played their home games at the Tulsa Convention Center. Led by head coach Nolan Richardson, they finished the season 24–6 overall and 12–4 in conference play to finish second in the MVC standings. The Golden Hurricane won the MVC tournament to receive an automatic bid to the NCAA tournament as the No. 3 seed in the Midwest region. Tulsa lost to No. 6 seed and eventual Final Four participant Houston in the round of 32.

Roster

Schedule and results

|-
!colspan=9 style=| Regular season

|-
!colspan=9 style=| MVC Tournament

|-
!colspan=9 style=| NCAA Tournament

Rankings

NBA Draft

References

Tulsa Golden Hurricane men's basketball seasons
Tulsa
Tulsa Golden Hurricane men's b
Tulsa Golden Hurricane men's b
Tulsa